Marie-Charms Mishael Morgan (born July 15, 1986) known professionally as Mishael Morgan, is a Trinidadian-Canadian actress known for the roles of Hilary Curtis and Amanda Sinclair on CBS Daytime soap opera, The Young and the Restless, the latter for which she became the first black actress to win the Daytime Emmy Award for Outstanding Lead Actress in a Drama Series in 2022.

Early life
Marie-Charms Mishael Morgan was born in San Fernando, Trinidad and Tobago, on July 15, 1986. Morgan is the daughter of Michael and Sharon (Lee) Morgan; she has an older sister, Maggris, and a younger sister, Monique. When Morgan was 5 years old, her parents relocated the family to New York where Mishael found work. However, thinking it would be safer, the family relocated to Toronto, Ontario, Canada, and settled in Mississauga. She attended York University in Toronto, and later began her career on television.

Career
From 2008 to 2009, she had a recurring role in the Canadian teen drama series The Best Years, and later was regular cast member of YTV sitcom, Family Biz. In 2012, she had a recurring role in the CBC Television comedy-drama Republic of Doyle, and also appeared in small roles in films Casino Jack (2010) and Total Recall (2012). Morgan also guest-starred on Supernatural and The Listener. In 2014, Morgan also starred in The CW summer comedy series, Backpackers.

In May 2013, Morgan was cast as Hilary Curtis in the CBS daytime soap opera, The Young and the Restless. On June 11, 2018, Morgan confirmed earlier reports that she would be leaving the soap. Morgan's representation later confirmed that Morgan opted to leave after unsuccessful attempts to negotiate for an increase in salary. Morgan made her final appearance as Hilary on the soap on July 27, 2018, when the character succumbed to life-threatening injuries sustained in a car accident. On September 19, 2019, she confirmed her return to the show the same day she debuted as her new character, Amanda Sinclair. 

On June 24, 2022, Morgan became the first black woman to win the Daytime Emmy Award for Outstanding Lead Actress in a Drama Series, which she won for her portrayal of Amanda Sinclair.

Personal life
Morgan married Navid Ali in May 2012. Morgan gave birth to their first child, a son, in 2015. On July 19, 2015, her The Young and the Restless co-star, Christel Khalil, co-hosted her baby shower. The couple also have a daughter, born in 2018.

Filmography

Awards and nominations

References

External links

 

Living people
1986 births
Canadian television actresses
Canadian soap opera actresses
Daytime Emmy Award winners
Daytime Emmy Award for Outstanding Lead Actress in a Drama Series winners
York University alumni
21st-century Canadian actresses
People from San Fernando, Trinidad and Tobago
Trinidad and Tobago emigrants to Canada